Maria Sharapova was the defending champion, but chose not to compete.
Nadia Petrova won the title, defeating Amélie Mauresmo 6–3, 7–5 in the final.

Main draw

Seeds
The top four seeds received a bye into the second round.

Finals

Top half

Bottom half

Qualifying draw
Displayed below is the qualifying draw of the 2006 Qatar Ladies Open Singles.

Seeds

Qualifiers

Results

First qualifier

Second qualifier

Third qualifier

Fourth qualifier

References

External links
 Results
 wtatour.com website
 iftennis.com website

Qatar Ladies Open
Qatar Ladies Open
2006 in Qatari sport